The Royal Park Arcade (also known as the Parkway Plaza) is a historic site in Vero Beach, Florida. It is located at 1059 21st Street. On July 31, 1998, it was added to the U.S. National Register of Historic Places.

References

External links

 Indian River County listings at National Register of Historic Places
 Florida's Office of Cultural and Historical Programs
 Indian River County listings
 Royal Park Arcade

National Register of Historic Places in Indian River County, Florida
Buildings and structures in Vero Beach, Florida